The 1993 Tirreno–Adriatico was the 28th edition of the Tirreno–Adriatico cycle race and was held from 10 March to 17 March 1993. The race started in Ostia and finished in San Benedetto del Tronto. The race was won by Maurizio Fondriest of the Lampre team.

General classification

References

1993
1993 in Italian sport